Ri Sung-gi, also often spelled Lee Sung-ki, Lee Seung-gi  or Yi Sung-gi (1905–1996), was a North Korean chemist. He is best remembered as the inventor of Vinalon. He has also been accused of involvement in North Korea's chemical and nuclear weapons programs.

Ri was born in Damyang, Jeollanam-do, in 1905. He graduated from the local pot'ong hakkyo and received his degree in chemistry from Kyoto University in 1931. He developed Vinalon in 1939. In 1946, after Korean independence from Japanese occupation, he participated in the development of Gyeongseong University, but strongly opposed the university's official conversion to Seoul National University under the American military government. Following the outbreak of the Korean War in 1950, he defected to the North.

Ri received the Lenin Prize in 1962, and was made head of the North Korean Atomic Energy Research Institute in June 1965. He became chief of the Hamhŭng branch of the Academy of Sciences in 1984.

Works

Notes

External links

Empas entry  
Naver entry 

1905 births
1996 deaths
North Korean inventors
North Korean scientists
People from South Jeolla Province
Korean chemists
South Korean defectors
Kyoto University alumni
Academic staff of Kyoto University
20th-century North Korean scientists
21st-century North Korean scientists
Foreign Members of the USSR Academy of Sciences
Foreign Members of the Russian Academy of Sciences
South Korean emigrants to North Korea